The 1996–97 Liga Leumit season saw Beitar Jerusalem win their third title. Hapoel Tayibe (the first Arab club to play in the top flight since the establishment of Israel) and Tzafririm Holon were relegated to Liga Artzit. Motti Kakoun of Hapoel Petah Tikva was the league's top scorer with 20 goals.

Final table

Results

Top scorers

References
Israel - List of Final Tables RSSSF
Liga Leumit IFA 

Liga Leumit seasons
Israel
1996–97 in Israeli football leagues